Gillian Lind (25 August 1904 - 25 October 1983) was a British stage, film and television actress. In 1930 she starred in Edgar Wallace's play On the Spot in the West End. She went on to enjoy a long career in film and television. Initially appearing onscreen as a female lead, she later transitioned into character roles. In 1957 she appeared in the BBC Dickens adaptation Nicholas Nickleby as the protagonist's mother. She featured on the 1964 series Ann Veronica based on a novel by H.G. Wells.

She was married to the actor Cyril Raymond.

Selected filmography
 Condemned to Death (1932)
 Dick Turpin (1933)
 The Man Outside (1933)
 Open All Night (1934)
 Death Croons the Blues (1937)
 The Oracle (1953)
 The Heart of the Matter (1953)
 Aunt Clara (1954)
 Don't Talk to Strange Men (1962)
 Fear in the Night (1972)
 And Now the Screaming Starts! (1973)

Selected stage credits
 Alibi (1928)
 On the Spot (1930)
 Clive of India (1934)

References

Bibliography
 Kabatchnik, Amnon. Blood on the Stage, 1975-2000: Milestone Plays of Crime, Mystery, and Detection : an Annotated Repertoire. Rowman & Littlefield, 2012.

External links

1904 births
1983 deaths
British television actresses
British film actresses
British stage actresses
20th-century British actresses
British people in colonial India